Portrait of Charles of Bourbon in Hunting Dress is an oil on canvas painting by Antonio Sebastiani, likely produced in the 1730s either whilst Charles was still in the Duchy of Parma and Piacenza or at the latest during the early years of his rule of Naples and Sicily - Sebastiani was the court painter. It is now in Room 32 of the National Museum of Capodimonte in Naples, part of the building's former royal apartments.

Sources
Mario Sapio, Il Museo di Capodimonte, Napoli, Arte'm, 2012. 
https://web.archive.org/web/20150128133836/http://cir.campania.beniculturali.it/museodicapodimonte/itinerari-tematici/galleria-di-immagini/OA900472
Touring Club Italiano, Museo di Capodimonte, Milano, Touring Club Editore, 2012. 

18th-century portraits
Portraits of men
Paintings in the collection of the Museo di Capodimonte
Portraits by Italian artists